The Men's 55 kg event at the 2010 South American Games was held on March 21.

Medalists

Results

Main Bracket

Repechage

References
Report

M55